This list of civil awards and decorations is a partial index to articles about notable civil awards and decorations. It excludes Law enforcement awards and honors and ecclesiastical decorations, which are covered by separate lists. See :Category:Civil awards and decorations by country for a more complete list by country.

General

Fire service awards and honors

Honorary citizens

Polar exploration

See also

 Lists of awards
 Civil awards and decorations
 :Category:Civil awards and decorations by country
 Cross of Merit (disambiguation)

References

 
Civil awards and decorations